Matt Davis (born October 3, 1979 in Birmingham, Alabama) is an American stand up comedian. He is regularly featured on XM Radio's Comedy 150 and tours internationally.

Biography
Matt Davis first took the stage at age 17 at the Comedy Club Stardome in Birmingham, Alabama where he later served as the club's house emcee for a year and a half before taking to the road full-time. Davis has since logged headlining dates in some of the most respected clubs in the country including The Punchline, Funny Bone(s), The Stardome, and many others. 
He has appeared at The Just for Laughs Festival in Montreal and Sketchfest in San Francisco.

Discography
Flummux (DVD) - 2005
Illegal, OnTime, and Aroused (CD) - 2008

External links
Official website
Promotional Photos
Matt Davis on Myspace

1979 births
American stand-up comedians
Living people
21st-century American comedians